Mark Crawford is a Canadian theatre actor and playwright. He is best known for his 2016 play The Birds and the Bees, one of the most widely-produced new Canadian plays of the 2010s.

Originally from Glencoe, Ontario, he is a graduate of the theatre programs at the University of Toronto and Sheridan College. He was a stage actor for ten years before premiering his first theatrical play Stag and Doe at the Blyth Festival in 2014. His second play Bed and Breakfast, about a gay couple from Toronto who open a bed and breakfast in a small town, premiered at the Thousand Islands Playhouse in 2015, and The Birds and the Bees, a comedy about an adult woman returning to live with her elderly mother after her divorce, premiered at the Blyth Festival in 2016.

In 2017 he premiered Boys, Girls and Other Mythological Creatures, a youth play about a young child struggling with gender identity issues. His most recent play The New Canadian Curling Club, a comedy about new immigrants joining a curling team, premiered at Blyth in 2018 and has also since been produced across Canada.

Crawford is the partner of playwright and actor Paul Dunn.

References

External links

21st-century Canadian male actors
21st-century Canadian male writers
21st-century Canadian dramatists and playwrights
Canadian male stage actors
Canadian male dramatists and playwrights
Canadian LGBT dramatists and playwrights
Canadian gay actors
Canadian gay writers
Male actors from Ontario
Writers from Ontario
University of Toronto alumni
Sheridan College alumni
People from Middlesex County, Ontario
Living people
Year of birth missing (living people)
Gay dramatists and playwrights
21st-century Canadian LGBT people